Koip Peak is a 12,968-foot-elevation (3,953 meter) summit in Mono County, California, in the United States. It is located in the Ansel Adams Wilderness, on land managed by Inyo National Forest.

Koip is derived from a Western Numic name meaning "mountain sheep". Bighorn sheep roam in the area.

Climate
According to the Köppen climate classification system, Koip Peak is located in an alpine climate zone. Most weather fronts originate in the Pacific Ocean, and travel east toward the Sierra Nevada mountains. As fronts approach, they are forced upward by the peaks (orographic lift), causing them to drop their moisture in the form of rain or snowfall onto the range.

Gallery

References

External links 
 

Mountains of Mono County, California
Mountains of the Ansel Adams Wilderness
North American 3000 m summits
Mountains of Northern California
Sierra Nevada (United States)
Inyo National Forest